Apalyovo, or Apalevo, is the name of several rural localities in Russia:
Apalyovo, Pskov Oblast, a village in Gdovsky District of Pskov Oblast
Apalyovo, Tver Oblast, a village in Itomlya Rural Settlement of Rzhevsky District of Tver Oblast